Manuel "Manolo" Cidre Miranda (born 1953) is a Cuban-born Puerto Rican businessman and politician who became, on December 1, 2015, an official candidate for Governor of Puerto Rico. He lost the election to Ricardo Rosselló.
He was appointed by Governor-Elect Pedro R. Pierluisi on December 2, 2020 as incoming Secretary of the Puerto Rico Department of Economic Development and Commerce.

Biography
Manuel Cidre arrived in Puerto Rico from his native Cuba at a young age, first living in the northern coastal city of Arecibo. In 1978 he started a company in Bayamon named "Los Cidrines", which sells bakery goods and bread in Puerto Rico along with his brother, Guillermo Cidre. The company also sells in the US market, with this operation managed by his sister Maria Cidre.

He has served in multiple community and philanthropic organizations in Puerto Rico, and as the president of the following associations:
 Asociación Productos de Puerto Rico
 Asociación de Industriales de Puerto Rico
 Alianza para el Desarrollo de PR (founder)
 Small Business Development & Technology Center

Personal life 
Manuel Cidre has 4 children and 6 grandchildren. He is married to Anabelle Colón.

Political career
Cidre ran for Governor of Puerto Rico during the Puerto Rican general election, 2016 as an independent candidate. Asked by Carmen Jovet which of the three main ideologies in Puerto Rico (statehood, free association or independence) he identified with, he declined to identify himself with any of them but commented that he is against Puerto Rico's status as a colony. In the debate of Young in Telemundo he declared that he will not support statehood.

External links

1953 births
Living people
People from Arecibo, Puerto Rico
Cuban businesspeople
Cuban emigrants to Puerto Rico
Cuban politicians
21st-century Puerto Rican politicians